Plain Dealing is a historic home located near Keene, Albemarle County, Virginia. It is an "H"-shaped dwelling, consisting of a two-story main block and a parallel -story rear wing connected by a two-story hyphen. The two-story main section was built about 1787, and the -story wing may predate it.  The front facade is five bays wide, and features an original tetrastyle porch supported on Doric order piers.

It was added to the National Register of Historic Places in 1980.

References

External links
Photographs of Plain Dealing in the Library of Congress, Carnegie Survey of the Architecture of the South, 1933

Houses on the National Register of Historic Places in Virginia
Houses completed in 1787
Houses in Albemarle County, Virginia
National Register of Historic Places in Albemarle County, Virginia
1787 establishments in Virginia